The National Women's Soccer League (NWSL) presents six annual awards to individual players. The Golden Boot award is presented to the top scorer at the end of the regular season, while the Most Valuable Player, Defender of the Year, Goalkeeper of the Year, Rookie of the Year, and Coach of the Year awards are voted on by various league constituents.  these awards are voted upon in two rounds: in the first round, players (50%), owners/general managers/coaches (25%), and media (25%) vote to determine the nominees; in the second round, players (50%), owners/general managers/coaches (20%), media (20%), and fans (10%) vote among the nominees to determine the winners.

In addition, the league also presents two teams of the season awards, the NWSL Best XI and the NWSL Second XI, to individual players.  the teams of the season awards are voted on by players (50%), owners/general managers/coaches (20%), media (20%), and fans (10%). Voters for the teams of the season awards are required to name one goalkeeper, four defenders, and a combination of six midfielders and forwards.

Most Valuable Player

Golden Boot

Defender of the Year

Goalkeeper of the Year

Rookie of the Year

Coach of the Year

Teams of the Year

2013
Best XI

Second XI

2014
Best XI

Second XI

2015
Announced September 24, 2015

Best XI

Second XI

2016
Announced October 7, 2016

Best XI

Second XI

2017
Best XI

Announced October 12, 2017

Second XI

Announced October 10, 2017

2018
Announced September 20, 2018

Best XI

Second XI

2019
Announced October 24, 2019

Best XI

Second XI

2021
Announced November 17, 2021

Best XI

Second XI

2022
Announced October 25, 2022

Best XI

Second XI

Most selections 
 Only players with multiple total selections are included.

See also 

 List of sports awards honoring women
 NWSL Players' Awards
 NWSL Team of the Month
 NWSL Rookie of the Month
 NWSL Player of the Month
 NWSL Player of the Week
 NWSL records and statistics
 List of NWSL drafts
 Women's soccer in the United States

References 

Awards established in 2013
 
Awards
Lists of women's association football players
Association football player non-biographical articles